Janusz Piechociński (born 15 March 1960 in Studzianki) is a Polish politician, Minister of the Economy and Deputy Prime Minister of Poland from 6 December 2012 to 16 November 2015. From 17 November 2012 to 7 November 2015 he was President of the Polish People's Party.

References

External links
  
Official blog 
  
 

|-

|-

1960 births
Economy ministers of Poland
Living people
People from Kozienice County
Polish People's Party politicians
Recipients of the Order of the Cross of Terra Mariana, 1st Class
Deputy Prime Ministers of Poland
Members of the Polish Sejm 2007–2011
Members of the Polish Sejm 2011–2015
Academic staff of the SGH Warsaw School of Economics